László Szarka  (*1953 in Galanta, Czechoslovakia) is a Hungarian historian.

Szarka studied at the Faculty of Philosophy of the Comenius University in Bratislava; worked at the Institute of Historical Studies of the Slovak Academy of Sciences (SAS); in 1977 he was sent to Budapest to the single-post branch of the SAS.

In 1978 Szarka applied for Hungarian citizenship and got employed in the Committee on History at the Hungarian Academy of Sciences (HAS); he became the director of the Research Institute of Ethnic and National Minorities at HAS after the Institute was founded in 2001.

An interview with Szarka (in Hungarian).

Work
Szlovákok története (The History of Slovaks) (Bereményi könyvkiadó Budapest 199?)
Szlovák nemzeti fejlõdés - magyar nemzetiségi politika 1867-1918 (Slovak National Development and the Nationalist Policy of the Hungarian Empire) (Kalligram Bratislava 1995)
Duna-táji dilemmák. Nemzeti kisebbségek - kisebbségi politika a 20. századi Kelet-Közép-Európában (Dilemmas from the Danube, National Minorities - Minority Politics in the Central and Eastern Europe of the 20th Century) (Budapest 1998)
Edvard Beneš elnöki dekrétumairól (Of the Presidential Decrees of Edvard Beneš) (História 2/2002)

20th-century Hungarian historians
1953 births
Living people
21st-century Hungarian historians
People from Galanta